Bek Air Flight 2100 was a domestic passenger flight from Almaty to Nur-Sultan, Kazakhstan, operated by a Fokker 100 that crashed on 27 December 2019 while taking off from Almaty International Airport. Of the 98 people on board – 93 passengers and five crew, 13 died in the crash and 66 were injured. The Kazakh government started investigations the same day.

Aircraft and crew 
The aircraft involved was a Fokker 100, built in 1996, which previously was flown by Formosa Airlines, Mandarin Airlines, Contact Air, and OLT Express Germany, before joining the Bek Air fleet in 2013 as UP-F1007. The aircraft was leased to Kam Air in September 2016, then returned. The aircraft was also leased to Safi Airways in February 2017, returned to Bek Air, and finally leased to Air Djibouti in December 2018, before being returned again. The aircraft remained in service with Bek Air until the day of the accident, which destroyed it. The airworthiness certificate of the aircraft had been renewed on 22 May 2019.

The captain was 58-year-old Marat Ganievich Muratbaev and the first officer was 54-year-old Mirzhan Gaynulovich Muldakulov.

Accident 
The aircraft crashed into a building just after takeoff from Almaty International Airport in Kazakhstan.  The plane took off from runway 05R and lost altitude shortly afterwards; during take-off, its tail was reported to have hit the runway twice. It reportedly turned to the right and hit a concrete perimeter fence, before impacting a two-storey building in a residential area, close to the perimeter track, around 7:22am local time.  The front of the aircraft broke away from the main fuselage, sustaining significant damage, and the tail broke off at the rear.

One of the survivors, businessman Aslan Nazarliev, stated he had seen ice on the wings. In a telephone conversation, he said, "The left-wing jolted really hard, I noticed that then jolted the right, and the plane began swinging as a boat." Nazarliev continued, "When we took off, the plane began to shake very hard and I knew it was going to fall ... All the people who stepped on the wing fell, because there was ice. I cannot say that [before taking off] the wings were not sprayed with antifreeze, but the fact is that there was ice."

Victims 
Thirteen people, including the captain and first officer, who died in hospital nearly a month after the accident, were killed, and 66 were injured. The passengers consisted of 85 adults, five children, and three infants; there were five crew.

Aftermath 
The president of Kazakhstan, Kassym-Jomart Tokayev, declared the following day, 28 December, a national day of mourning and said, "all those responsible will be severely punished in accordance with the law". Kazakh authorities suspended Bek Air's flight authorization after the accident.

In late January of 2020, the Aviation Administration of Kazakhstan (AAK) revealed serious safety violations at the airline. The AAK found that Bek Air pilots routinely neglected to perform a walk-around and inspect for airframe ice before take-off, and had skipped these procedures on the accident flight, in violation of operations manuals from both the aircraft manufacturer and the airline. Despite flying in a region with severe winters, the airline conducted no special training for winter operations. Bek Air mechanics routinely swapped parts between aircraft without keeping detailed records, and data plates had been removed from aircraft engines and other parts, hindering verification of service histories. The condition of the airline's fleet was assessed as poor.

On 17 April 2020, citing the airline's failure to correct the safety violations discovered during the investigation, the AAK recalled the company's air operator's certificate and the airworthiness certificates of its remaining Fokker 100 aircraft.

On May 2021, the Talgar District Court of Almaty sentenced a real estate agent and five building officials—including the former head of the Department of Land Relations of Talgar—to prison for the illegal and fraudulent sale of building sites close to the airport. Bek Air had said that the crash would have been less severe if building restrictions around the airport had been enforced.

See also 
 Palair Macedonian Airlines Flight 301

References

External links 
 The passenger plane crash in Kazakhstan. Online report. RIA Novosti 
 

2019 disasters in Kazakhstan
21st century in Almaty
Accidents and incidents involving the Fokker 100
Aviation accidents and incidents in 2019
Aviation accidents and incidents in Kazakhstan
December 2019 events in Asia
Airliner accidents and incidents caused by ice